Starchild or Star Child may refer to:

Music
Starchild (band), a Canadian band
Starchild (Teena Marie album), 1984
Starchild (O.C. album), 2005
"Starchild" (song), a song by Level 42
"Mothership Connection (Star Child)", a 1976 song by the band Parliament originally released as "Star Child"
"Starchild", a Star One song from the 2003 album Space Metal
"Starchild", a Wintersun song from the 2004 album Wintersun
"Starchild", a Freedom Call song from the 2005 album The Circle of Life
"Starchild", a Jamiroquai song from the 2005 album Dynamite

Literature
Star Child, a 1998 science fiction novel by James P. Hogan
Star Child, a novel by Fred Mustard Stewart
"The Star-Child", a story in the A House of Pomegranates collection by Oscar Wilde
Starchild Trilogy, a 1960s science fiction trilogy by Frederik Pohl and Jack Williamson
 Starchild (novel), the second novel in the trilogy

Folklore and fictional characters
In folklore and fiction, a kind of changeling or foundling, a child seemingly having fallen from the stars and not of ordinary human descent
Inspired by this, the pseudoscientific New Age concept of indigo children and the New Age belief in star people
In New Age belief, the child of a human and a Grey alien
Starchild (comics), a comic book series and character
The Star Child, the entity main character David Bowman is transformed into at the ending of 2001: A Space Odyssey
The English translation of Superman's Kryptonian name (Kal-El)

Companies
Starchild (label), a defunct Japanese record label
Starchild Productions, a Sydney-based production company

See also
Starchild skull